Salesian College of Higher Education, is a general degree college in Dimapur, Nagaland. It offers undergraduate courses in arts. This college is affiliated to Nagaland University. This college was established in 1982.

Departments

Arts
English 
History 
Political Science 
Sociology
Philosophy

Accreditation
The college is recognized by the University Grants Commission (UGC).

References

External links
https://scdimapur.org/

Colleges affiliated to Nagaland University
Universities and colleges in Nagaland
Educational institutions established in 1982
1982 establishments in Nagaland